The women's individual compound competition at the 2013 World Archery Championships took place on 29 September – 6 October 2013 in Belek, Turkey.

78 archers from 37 countries entered the competition, with a maximum of three entries per country. All archers qualified for the 7-round knockout tournament, with the top 8 scores in qualifying receiving a bye to the third round. The reigning champion was Albina Loginova of Russia.

Schedule
All times are local (UTC+02:00).

Qualification round
Pre-tournament world rankings ('WR') are taken from the 28 August 2013 World Archery Rankings. The qualification round consisted of two sessions of 36 arrows, with equal scores separated by number of 10s, then number of X's and world ranking, expect in the case of 7-9th place which was resolved by shoot-off. With fewer than 104 entrants, all archers qualified for the elimination rounds with those ranked 9th-34th effectively receiving byes to the 2nd round.

 Bye to third round 
 Qualified for eliminations

Elimination rounds

Top half

Section 1

Section 2

Section 3

Section 4

Bottom half

Section 5

Section 6

Section 7

Section 8

Finals

References

2013 World Archery Championships
World